Our Political Tasks is a pamphlet by Leon Trotsky, published in 1904 as a response to the book of Vladimir Lenin "One Step Forward, Two Steps Back". It is the first relatively large work of the author; the book was aimed against the RSDLP party split, in which Lenin was accused.

References

Literature 
 Knei-Paz B. The Social and Political Thought of Leon Trotsky. — 1st. — Oxford University Press, 1978. — 652 p. — . — .
 Carlo A. Trotsky and the Party: From Our Political Tasks to the October Revolution // The Ideas of Leon Trotsky / eds. Hillel Ticktin, Michael Cox. — Porcupine Press, 1995. — 386 p. — . — .
 Saccarelli E. Gramsci and Trotsky in the Shadow of Stalinism: The Political Theory and Practice of Opposition. — Routledge, 2008. — 320 p. — . — .

External Links 
Leon Trotsky: "Our Political Tasks" at the Marxists Internet Archive.
1904 non-fiction books
Works by Leon Trotsky